Dương Thúy Vi (born May 11, 1993) is a wushu taolu athlete from Vietnam. She is one of the most renowned Southeast Asian athletes of all time, having won numerous medals at the World Wushu Championships, Asian Games, Southeast Asian Games, and the Asian Wushu Championships.

Early life 
Thúy Vi was born to a father who practiced shaolinquan and a mother who was a wing chun fighter, and started training in the martial arts under her parents at the age of three. When she was seven, one of her cousins was taken by her father to practice wushu to lose weight and thus Thúy Vi eventually discovered modern wushu taolu.

Career

Junior 
Thúy Vi made her international debut at the 2005 Asian Junior Wushu Championships where she won a silver medal in jianshu and a bronze medal in qiangshu. She then was a silver medalist in jianshu at the 1st World Junior Wushu Championships in 2006. The following year, she won silver medals in changquan qiangshu at the 2007 Asian Junior Wushu Championships. Two years later, Thúy Vi was the Asian junior champion in changquan and a bronze medalist in jianshu after competing in the 2009 Asian Junior Wushu Championships. Her last junior competition was at the 2011 Asian Junior Wushu Championships where she was the Asian junior champion in jianshu and qiangshu and also won a bronze medal in changquan.

Senior 
Thúy Vi first competed in the 2011 Southeast Asian Games where she won the bronze medal in women's jianshu and qiangshu combined. She then competed in the 2011 World Wushu Championships where she won a silver medal in duilian and a bronze medal in jianshu. In 2012, she competed in the Asian Wushu Championships in Hanoi and won a silver medal in jianshu and a bronze medal in duilian with Hoàng Thị Phương Giang. The following year, the won a gold medal in jianshu and a silver medal in qiangshu at the 2013 Southeast Asian Games. Shortly after, Thúy Vi became the world champion in qiangshu and a silver medalist in jianshu at the 2013 World Wushu Championships. These repeated victories prepared her for the 2014 Asian Games where she was the gold medalist in women's jianshu and qiangshu, thus achieving Vietnam's first gold medal in Wushu at the Asian Games and only gold at the 2014 games. This victory led Thúy Vi to be the first Vietnamese athlete to be featured in a CNN publication in the United States.  

At the 2015 Southeast Asian Games, Thúy Vi won medals of all colors with a gold victory in jianshu. Shortly after this, she was a double silver medalist in her weapons events and a bronze medalist in changquan at the 2015 World Wushu Championships. This qualified her for the 2016 Taolu World Cup where she won the silver medal in jianshu. She then competed in the 2016 Asian Wushu Championships and was a bronze medalist in qiangshu. A year later, she was a double gold medalist in jianshu and qiangshu at the 2017 Southeast Asian Games, and was the world champion in qiangshu once again at the 2017 World Wushu Championships. Thúy Vi then competed in the 2018 Asian Games and won the bronze medal in women's jianshu and qiangshu. Her most recent competition was at the 2019 World Wushu Championships where she won two silver medals in jianshu and qiangshu.

Her first major competition after the start of the COVID-19 pandemic was the 2021 Southeast Asian Games (which took place in May 2022) where she won gold medals in jianshu and qiangshu and a bronze in changquan. Shortly after, she won the gold medal in women's jianshu and qiangshu combined at the 2022 World Games, the first medal for Vietnam at the games.

Competitive history

See also 

 List of Asian Games medalists in wushu

References

1993 births
Living people
Vietnamese wushu practitioners
Asian Games gold medalists for Vietnam
Asian Games bronze medalists for Vietnam
Asian Games medalists in wushu
Wushu practitioners at the 2010 Asian Games
Wushu practitioners at the 2014 Asian Games
Wushu practitioners at the 2018 Asian Games
Medalists at the 2014 Asian Games
Medalists at the 2018 Asian Games
Southeast Asian Games gold medalists for Vietnam
Southeast Asian Games silver medalists for Vietnam
Southeast Asian Games bronze medalists for Vietnam
Southeast Asian Games medalists in wushu
Competitors at the 2011 Southeast Asian Games
Competitors at the 2013 Southeast Asian Games
Competitors at the 2015 Southeast Asian Games
Competitors at the 2017 Southeast Asian Games
Competitors at the 2013 World Games
Competitors at the 2022 World Games
World Games gold medalists
World Games medalists in wushu
Competitors at the 2021 Southeast Asian Games
20th-century Vietnamese women
21st-century Vietnamese women